An octreotide scan is a type of SPECT scintigraphy used to find carcinoid, pancreatic neuroendocrine tumors, and to localize sarcoidosis. It is also called somatostatin receptor scintigraphy (SRS). Octreotide, a drug similar to somatostatin, is radiolabeled with indium-111, and is injected into a vein and travels through the bloodstream. The radioactive octreotide attaches to tumor cells that have receptors for somatostatin (i.e. gastrinoma, glucagonoma, etc.). A gamma camera detects the radioactive octreotide, and makes pictures showing where the tumor cells are in the body, typically by a SPECT technique. A technetium-99m based radiopharmaceutical kit is also available.

Octreotide scanning is reported to have a sensitivity between 75% and 100% for detecting pancreatic neuroendocrine tumors.

Instead of gamma-emitting 111In, certain octreotide derivatives such as edotreotide (DOTATOC) or DOTATATE are able to be linked by chelation to positron-emitting isotopes such as gallium-68 and copper-64 which in turn can be evaluated with more precise (compared with SPECT) scanning techniques such as PET-CT. Thus, the octreotide scan is now being replaced in most centers with gallium-68 DOTATATE and copper-64 DOTATATE scans. Somatostatin receptor imaging can now be performed with positron emission tomography (PET) which offers higher resolution and more rapid imaging.

Indications
An octreotide scan may be used to locate suspected primary neuroendocrine tumours (NET) or for follow-up or staging after treatment.

Where indicated, octreotide scanning for NET tumors is being increasingly replaced by gallium-68 DOTA and copper-64 DOTATATE scans.

Procedure

Indium-111

The indium-111 pentetreotide radiopharmaceutical is prepared from a kit in a radiopharmacy. Pentetreotide is a DTPA conjugate of octreotide.

Approximately 200 megabecquerels (MBq) of indium-111 is injected intravenously. Imaging takes place 24 hours after injection, but may also be carried out at 4 and 48 hours.

Technetium-99m
The 99mTc product is supplied as a kit with two vials, one containing the chelating agent ethylenediaminediacetic acid (EDDA) and the other the HYNIC-Tyr3-octreotide chelator and somatostatin analog. Approximately 400-700 MBq may be administered, with imaging at 2, 4, and occasionally 24 hours post administration. 99mTc based octreotide imaging shows slightly higher sensitivity than 111In.

References

External links 
 
 Octreotide scan entry in the public domain NCI Dictionary of Cancer Terms

2d nuclear medical imaging
Medical imaging